Dolly-Rose Campbell (born 12 April 1987) is an English actress, who has played Gemma Winter on the ITV soap opera Coronation Street since 2014. The most famous of her storylines was Gemma giving birth to quadruplets.

Personal life
In 2019, Dolly-Rose came out as bisexual.

Filmography

Guest appearances
 Lorraine (2016, 2019)
 Hilda Ogden's Last Ta Ra - A Tribute to Jean Alexander (2016)
 Granada Reports (2018, 2019)
 Good Morning Britain (2019)

Awards and nominations

References

External links

1987 births
Living people
English television actresses
English soap opera actresses
Actresses from Manchester
Actors from Lancashire
Actresses from Salford
English LGBT actors
English bisexual people
Bisexual actresses
21st-century English LGBT people